Shivajinagar is a small village in Ratnagiri district, Maharashtra state in Western India. The 2011 Census of India recorded a total of 1,089 residents in the village. Shivajinagar is 454.37 hectares in size.

References

Villages in Ratnagiri district